Law enforcement in Paraguay is primarily the responsibility of the National Police of Paraguay.

Law enforcement organizations of Paraguay

Historical secret police organizations

División Técnica de Represión del Comunismo (Technical Division for the Repression of Communism)
Departamento de Investigaciones de la Policía (DIPC) (Police Investigations Department)

Currently
National Police of Paraguay

See also 
 Crime in Paraguay

References

Sources
 World Police Encyclopedia, ed. by Dilip K. Das & Michael Palmiotto.  by Taylor & Francis. 2004,
 World Encyclopedia of Police Forces and Correctional Systems, 2nd.  edition,  Gale., 2006
 Sullivan, Larry E. et al.  Encyclopedia of Law Enforcement. Thousand Oaks: Sage Publications, 2005.

 
Law of Paraguay